Zou Zhenxian (born November 10, 1955) is a retired Chinese triple jumper, best known for finishing fourth at the 1984 Summer Olympics.

His personal best jump is 17.34 metres, achieved in September 1981 in Rome. This was the oldest Chinese record, until Li Yanxi broke it with a distance of 17.59 metres.

International competitions

References
, picture

1955 births
Living people
Chinese male triple jumpers
Olympic athletes of China
Athletes (track and field) at the 1984 Summer Olympics
Asian Games medalists in athletics (track and field)
Athletes (track and field) at the 1978 Asian Games
Athletes (track and field) at the 1982 Asian Games
Athletes (track and field) at the 1986 Asian Games
Universiade medalists in athletics (track and field)
Asian Games gold medalists for China
Asian Games silver medalists for China
Asian Games bronze medalists for China
Medalists at the 1978 Asian Games
Medalists at the 1982 Asian Games
Medalists at the 1986 Asian Games
Universiade gold medalists for China
Medalists at the 1981 Summer Universiade